The 2016 Dudley Metropolitan Borough Council election took place on 5 May 2016 to elect members of Dudley Metropolitan Borough Council in England. This was on the same day as other local elections.

Result

Council seats Results 
The table below shows a summary of the make-up of the City Council before the 5 May 2016 elections.

References

2016 English local elections
2016
2010s in the West Midlands (county)